Boyer Glover (fl. 1758-1771), Muggletonian, was a watch and clock maker in Leadenhall Street, London.

Glover was a strong Muggletonian, but the notices of him in the records of the sect are very scanty. He acted as a peacemaker, and opposed the issue of the fourth (1760) edition of Reeve and Muggleton's 'Divine Looking-Glass,' containing political passages omitted in the second (1661) and fifth (1846) editions. Others are in unprinted manuscript collections.

References

18th-century English people
English watchmakers (people)
English clockmakers
English songwriters